"Loma de Cayenas" is a song by the Dominican singer-songwriter duo of Vicente García and Juan Luis Guerra. It was released on October 26, 2018 by Sony Music Latin. It was the lead single of García's third studio album, Candela.

Charts

References 

2018 singles
Juan Luis Guerra songs